The Beryciformes  are a poorly-understood order of carnivorous ray-finned fishes consisting of 7 families, 30 genera, and 161 species. They feed on small fish and invertebrates. Beyond this, little is known about the biology of most member species because of their nocturnal habits and deepwater habitats. All beryciform species are marine and most live in tropical to temperate, deepwater environments. Some species move closer to the surface at night, while others live entirely in shallow water and are nocturnal, hiding in rock crevices and caves during the day. Several species are mesopelagic and bathypelagic. Beryciformes' bodies are deep and mildly compressed, typically with large eyes that help them see in darker waters. Member genera include the alfonsinos, squirrelfishes, flashlight fishes, fangtooth fishes, spinyfins, pineconefishes, redfishes, roughies, and slimeheads. A number of member species are caught commercially, including the alfonsino, the splendid alfonsino, and the orange roughy, the latter being much more economically important. Some species have bioluminescent bacteria contained in pockets of skin or in light organs near the eyes, including the anomalopids and monocentrids.

Taxonomy and phylogeny

Beryciforms first appeared during the Late Cretaceous period and have survived to today in relative abundance. They are considered the most primitive order in Acanthopterygii, and as such are split off at the base of the cladogram below from the rest of the member orders. Beryciforms are distinguished by having 18–19 caudal fin rays, as opposed to percomorphs, which have 17. Having fewer caudal fin rays is considered a sign of a more recently evolved species among fish. The whalefishes, beardfishes, gibberfishes, and pricklefishes were once considered members of Beryciformes, but have since been assigned to separate orders.

A recent phylogeny based on the work Betancur-Rodriguez et al. 2017. The Gibberichthyidae (gibberfishes) and Hispidoberycidae (spiny-scale pricklefish) of suborder Stephanoberycoidei were not examined.

Older classification
The order contains 7 families, 30 genera, and 161 species:

 Order Beryciformes
 Suborder Berycoidei
 Berycidae (alfonsinos, nannygais)
 Suborder Holocentroidei
 Holocentridae (soldierfishes, squirrelfishes)
 Suborder Trachichthyoidei
 Anomalopidae (flashlight fishes, lanterneye fishes)
 Diretmidae (spinyfins)
 Monocentridae (pineconefishes, pineapple fishes)
 Trachichthyidae (incl. Anoplogastridae)(slimeheads, redfishes, roughies, fangtooth fishes)
 Order Cetomimiformes
 Family Rondeletiidae (redmouth whalefishes)
 Family Barbourisiidae (red/velvet whalefishes)
 Family Cetomimidae (flabby whalefishes)
 Order Stephanoberyciformes
 Family Melamphaidae (bigscale fishes)
 Family Gibberichthyidae (gibberfishes)
 Family Hispidoberycidae (Spiny-scale pricklefishes)
 Family Stephanoberycidae (pricklefishes)

Human interaction
The Beryciformes are generally not important to humans, and their trend towards living in deeper waters generally keeps many species away from human activity. Several species are found in the aquarium trade, however. Pineapplefishes are of interest to fishkeepers for their bright colors, while squirrelfishes' shallower reef habitats and bright red colors make them more easily collected. Flashlight fishes are also kept as pets because of the bioluminescent organs underneath their eyes. The alfonsinos and orange roughy are of a different interest to humans, targeted by deepwater commercial fisheries. Increased catches could lead to steep population declines for these species as their extended lifespans make them vulnerable to overfishing. The orange roughy, for example, can live up to 149 years, but takes anywhere from 23 to 40 years to begin reproducing. Despite these risks, most of the species that have been evaluated by the International Union for Conservation of Nature (IUCN) are listed as Least Concern or Data Deficient; only a few are classified as Vulnerable.

Timeline of genera
The Beryciformes first appeared in the Late Cretaceous and still survive today in relative abundance.

References

External links
 
 
 
 

 
Ray-finned fish orders
Articles which contain graphical timelines